Richard Garnett C.B. (27 February 1835 – 13 April 1906) was a scholar, librarian, biographer and poet. He was son of Richard Garnett, an author, philologist (historical linguist) and assistant keeper of printed books in the British Museum, i.e. what is now the British Library.

Life
Born at Lichfield in Staffordshire, and educated at a school in Bloomsbury, he entered the British Museum in 1851 as an assistant librarian. Anthony Panizzi, a close friend of Garnett's father, invited the then 16-year-old Richard to work at the British Museum following his father's death. In 1875, he became superintendent of the Reading Room, in 1881, editor of the General Catalogue of Printed Books, and in 1890, succeeding George Bullen, he was Keeper of Printed Books until his retirement in 1899.

His literary works include numerous translations from the Greek, German, Italian, Spanish, and Portuguese; several books of verse; the book of short stories The Twilight of the Gods (1888, 16 stories; 12 stories added in the 1903 edition); biographies of Thomas Carlyle, John Milton, William Blake, and others; The Age of Dryden (1895); Essays of an Ex-Librarian (1901); a History of Italian Literature; English Literature: An Illustrated Record (with Edmund Gosse); and many articles for encyclopaedias, including the ninth and tenth editions of the Encyclopædia Britannica, and the Dictionary of National Biography.

He also discovered and edited some unpublished poems of Shelley (Relics of Shelley, 1862) and edited the republication of the newly discovered poetry collection Original Poetry by Victor and Cazire in 1898. His poem "Where Corals Lie" was set to music by Sir Edward Elgar as part of Sea Pictures and was first performed in 1899. Long interested in astrology, in 1880 he published a monograph on the subject, "The Soul and the Stars", in the University Magazine under the pseudonym "A. G. Trent"; ill health prevented him from writing more on the subject. He wrote a biography of prime minister Charles James Fox, published 1910.

In 1901, Garnett was elected as a member to the American Philosophical Society.

He died on 13 April 1906 and was buried on the eastern side of Highgate Cemetery.

According to Joseph McCabe, Garnett "cherished a genuine and somewhat mystical belief in religion, which combined hostility to priestcraft and dogma with a modified belief in astrology".

The writer, critic and editor Edward Garnett was his son, the translator Constance Garnett was his daughter-in-law, and the Bloomsbury Group writer David (Bunny) Garnett was his grandson.

References

External links

 
 
 
Richard Garnett Literary File at the Harry Ransom Center, University of Texas at Austin
Richard Garnett Collection Finding Aid at the Harry Ransom Center, UT–Austin
 Richard Garnett (1835–1906), Writer and poet; Keeper of Printed Books, British Museum(National Portrait Gallery)
 

1835 births
1906 deaths
Burials at Highgate Cemetery
People from Lichfield
English librarians
Employees of the British Library
English fantasy writers
English male poets
English short story writers
Richard
Victorian writers
19th-century English novelists
19th-century British short story writers